The 2023 Progressive Conservative Party of Newfoundland and Labrador leadership election will be held October 13–15, 2023 to select a successor to Ches Crosbie, who stepped down following his defeat in the 2021 Newfoundland and Labrador general election. Candidate nominations will open May 17, 2023, and close June 16, 2023. The new leader will be announced on October 14, 2023.

Timeline

March 27, 2021 – The preliminary results of the provincial election are announced, where Premier Andrew Furey is re-elected with a slim majority. Ches Crosbie, the party's leader, loses his seat in Windsor Lake to Liberal candidate John Hogan.
March 31, 2021 – After taking a few days to speak with the party caucus and his family, Crosbie announces his resignation as party leader. David Brazil is appointed as the interim leader, who believed it would take "a year or two" before a leadership convention would be held.
April 5, 2021 – Party president Eugene Manning resigns, citing that he would have to be impartial in a future leadership election. He is succeeded by vice president Matthew Janes as interim president.
August 19, 2021 – The party releases the rules for the leadership campaign without setting a formal date.
August 19, 2021 – Former mayor of Howley and disqualified 2014 leadership candidate Wayne Ronald Bennett declares his candidacy.
June 24, 2022 – Leadership Committee co-chairs Shawn Skinner and Rhonda McMeekin announced that the party will hold its leadership convention on October 13–15, 2023 at the Sheraton Hotel in St. John’s. Candidate nominations will open May 17, 2023, and close June 16, 2023. The new leader will be announced on October 14, 2023.
July 4, 2022 – MHA Lloyd Parrott announces his candidacy.
January 16, 2023 – Interim leader David Brazil announces he will not be a candidate for the permanent leadership.
January 17, 2023 – MHA Tony Wakeham announces his candidacy.
February 21, 2023 - Businessman and former PC Party president Eugene Manning announces his candidacy.

Declared candidates

Wayne Ronald Bennett

Former Mayor of Howley, former leader of the Newfoundland and Labrador First Party (2008–2011), perennial candidate

Date campaign launched: October 3, 2021

Eugene Manning

Businessman and former PC Party president

Date campaign launched: February 21, 2023

Campaign Website: www.eugenemanning.ca

Supporters
MHAs:
Prominent Supporters: Judy Manning, NL Minister of Justice (2014-2015); Fabian Manning, NL Senator; Kristina Ennis, 2021 candidate for St. John's West; Gillian Pearson, 2019 candidate for Mount Pearl-Southlands; Greg Smith, curler, 2021 St. John's City Council candidate

Lloyd Parrott

MHA for Terra Nova (2019–present), Clarenville town councillor (2017–2019).

Date campaign launched: July 4, 2022

Supporters
MHAs: Chris Tibbs, MHA for Grand Falls-Windsor-Buchans

Tony Wakeham

MHA for Stephenville-Port au Port (2019–present). Wakeham was a 2018 PC leadership candidate. He is the former CEO of Labrador-Grenfell Health. He also worked in senior health management roles in St. John's, Clarenville and Grand Falls-Windsor. Wakeham grew up in Placentia and studied economics at Memorial University. Wakeham, lives in Kippens, and also has deep roots in the sport of basketball, both as a player and coach at the provincial and federal levels. Wakeham previously served as President of the NLBA and Canada Basketball.  He and his wife Patricia have two adult children.

Date campaign launched: January 17, 2023

Campaign Website: www.tonywakeham.ca

Supporters
MHAs: Craig Pardy - MHA for Bonavista; Joedy Wall - MHA for Cape St. Francis; Pleaman Forsey - MHA for Exploits
Prominent Supporters: Katarina Roxon, Canadian Paralympic Swimmer; Paul Thomey, former President of the St. John's Board of Trade; Damian Follett, musician, 2021 PC candidate for Mount Scio; Shannon John Tobin, 2021 PC candidate for Lake Melville.

Potential candidates

Danny Breen, Mayor of St. John's (2017–present), former St. John's city councillor (2009–2017)
Barry Petten, MHA for Conception Bay South (2015–present)

Declined to run
David Brazil, Interim leader of the Progressive Conservative Party (2021–present), MHA for Conception Bay East–Bell Island (2010–present)
Shawn Skinner, former St. John's city councillor (1993–1997; 2020–2021), MHA for St. John's Centre (2003–2011)

References

Progressive Conservative Party of Newfoundland and Labrador leadership elections
2023 elections in Canada
Progressive Conservative
2023 political party leadership elections